This article is about the demographics of Saint Helena, Ascension and Tristan da Cunha, a British overseas territory in the south Atlantic Ocean.

Nationality

The citizens of Saint Helena, Ascension and Tristan da Cunha hold British Overseas Territories citizenship. On 21 May 2002 they were granted access to full British citizenship by the British Overseas Territories Act 2002, and there is a special Saint Helena passport issued to them.

Saint Helena
Saint Helena is the most populous part of Saint Helena, Ascension and Tristan da Cunha. The language spoken in Saint Helena is English.

The island has a small population of a few thousand inhabitants, mainly descended from Africans, Mixed race African and Europeans, British settlers, East India Company employees and indentured labourers from the South Asian sub-Continent, East Indies, Madagascar and China.

The people of Saint Helena are Saint Helenians (though locally they are known as "Saints"); the demonym being Saint Helenian.

A census in February 2016 recorded a population of 4,534 on the island. This compares with a figure of 4,257 recorded in 2008 and a figure of 5,157 recorded in 1998. The fall between 1998 and 2008 can be explained mostly by emigration, especially since 2002 when the islanders were granted full British citizenship. The main diasporas are to the United Kingdom, South Africa and more recently to the Falkland Islands, as well as on Ascension Island. The population density, based on the 2016 figure, is 37.3 persons per km2, or 95.3 per sq mile.

Districts of Saint Helena

The island of Saint Helena is administratively divided into eight districts, each with a community centre. The districts also serve as statistical subdivisions.  The island is a single electoral area, sending twelve representatives to the Legislative Council.

CIA World Factbook demographic statistics
The following demographic statistics are from the CIA World Factbook, unless otherwise indicated.

Population
NB: the following [CIA] figures represent the whole territory, including Ascension Island and Tristan da Cunha.

By 2010 estimates, per one thousand population: the birth rate is 10.95 births, and the death rate is 6.91 deaths. In the same year, it was estimated that the rate of population growth was 0.404%.

The median age for 2010 is 38.2 years. The following tables describe age structure and human sex ratio, as estimated for 2010.

Births and deaths 

Population by Sex and Age Group (Census 07.II.2021): 

The total fertility rate for 2010 is estimated at 1.56 children born per woman.

Ethnicity
According to the CIA World Factbook, 50% of the population of Saint Helena Island are African Saint Helenians, while Chinese Saint Helenians and White Saint Helenians make up 25% each. However, the possibility of clear-cut categorical divisions between ethnicities on present day St Helena, as reflected by these statistics, is disputed. Most Saint Helenians today are multiracial, similar to the Cape Coloureds.

Ascension has no civilian population, while Tristan da Cunha has a white population descended primarily from the British Isles or from the Falkland Islands.

Religion

The majority of St. Helenians are Anglican. Other religions in St. Helena include (in alphabetic order): the Baháʼí Faith, the Baptist church, Buddhism, Roman Catholicism, and Seventh-day Adventism.

According to the statistics in the 2014 Yearbook of Jehovah's Witnesses, Saint Helena has the highest proportion of Jehovah's Witnesses of any country or territory in the world: one person in thirty-five, using an estimated population of 4,000 for St Helena and a count of 118 members.

In Tristan da Cunha, Christianity is the main religion, with the largest denominations being Anglican and Roman Catholic.

Education
Where being literate is defined as being of age 20 or over and able to read and write, 97% percent of the total population is literate, according to estimates from 1987. 97% of males and 98% of females of St. Helena are literate under this definition by the same estimates.

Health
By 2010 estimates, life expectancy at birth for the total population is 78.6 years (for males it is 75.68; for females it is 81.67). The infant mortality rate is 16.98 deaths per 1,000 live births.

Ascension Island and Tristan da Cunha
Ascension Island has a population of around eight hundred inhabitants with the majority being Saint Helenians and located in Georgetown on the West Coast of the island with another small settlement, Two Boats located in Ascension’s interior.

Tristan da Cunha has a population of about three hundred inhabitants, mainly located in the Edinburgh of the Seven Seas settlement on Tristan’s North Coast.

See also
British Overseas Territory Citizens in mainland United Kingdom

References

 
Society of Saint Helena, Ascension and Tristan da Cunha